Taylors Arm is a perennial river of the Nambucca River catchment, located in the Mid North Coast region of New South Wales, Australia.

Course and features
Taylors Arm rises within New England National Park on the eastern slopes of Killiekrankie Mountain, below the Dorrigo Plateau that is part of the Great Dividing Range. The river flows generally southeast and then east northeast, joined by two minor tributaries, before reaching its confluence with the Nambucca River northwest of Macksville. The river descends  over its  course.

See also

 List of rivers of New South Wales (L–Z)
 List of rivers of Australia
 Rivers of New South Wales
 Taylors Arm

References

External links
 

 

Rivers of New South Wales
Mid North Coast
Nambucca Shire